Chang Tae-suk (born 22 September 1968) is a South Korean fencer. He competed in the individual and team épée events at the 1992 and 1996 Summer Olympics.

References

External links
 

1968 births
Living people
South Korean male épée fencers
Olympic fencers of South Korea
Fencers at the 1992 Summer Olympics
Fencers at the 1996 Summer Olympics
Asian Games medalists in fencing
Fencers at the 1990 Asian Games
Asian Games gold medalists for South Korea
Asian Games silver medalists for South Korea
Medalists at the 1990 Asian Games